Yir'on is a kibbutz in the Galilee Panhandle in northern Israel. Located adjacent to the Lebanese border, it falls under the jurisdiction of Upper Galilee Regional Council.

History
The village was established on 20 May 1949 by former members of the Palmach's Yiftach Brigade and graduates of the Dror–HeHalutz youth movement on the site of the depopulated Palestinian village of Saliha.

Ada Feinberg-Sireni, later a member of the Knesset, was amongst the founders. It was one of a series of villages established along the Lebanese border, with the intention of reinforcing the young state's borders. It was named after Iron, a biblical village of the Tribe of Naphtali, which is commonly identified with Yaroun, a Lebanese village 3 kilometers to the west.

Economy
The main income source is Paskal Technologies located in the Ma'alot-Tarshiha industrial zone. Other sources of income include a zipper factory (Paskal Zippers), field crops, fruit orchards (apples, pears, cherries and kiwis) and a furniture factory, Rehitay Yir'on, which specializes in ready-to-assemble furniture.

The  kibbutz operates a petting zoo, where red deer, spotted deer, rabbits and  chickens roam freely. Yir'on also rents out 38 guest houses to tourists.

In 2000 the Harei Hagalil Winery was established in partnership with the Ramat HaGolan Winery. The wine is produced from vineyards planted in the Galilee Mountains.

For many years, the kibbutz has cultivated a botanical garden. On the grounds of the kibbutz is a 200-year old hackberry tree, which is considered holy in Islamic tradition.

References

External links
Kibbutz website 
Kibbutz Yir'on Collection  on the Digital collections of Younes and Soraya Nazarian Library, University of Haifa

Kibbutzim
Kibbutz Movement
Populated places established in 1949
Populated places in Northern District (Israel)
1949 establishments in Israel